This article contains information about the literary events and publications of 1794.

Events
March 12 – The rebuilt Theatre Royal, Drury Lane, in London, designed by Henry Holland, opens to the public.
May 12 – William Godwin's novel Things as They Are; or, The Adventures of Caleb Williams is published in London as an attack on tyrannical government, although its controversial original preface and ending are suppressed. The work also contains elements of detective fiction.
May 14 – Mary Wollstonecraft's daughter by American speculator Gilbert Imlay, Fanny, is born in Le Havre.
June – English poets Samuel Taylor Coleridge and Robert Southey first meet, in Oxford while Coleridge is en route for a tour of Wales. They meet again in Bristol in August (where they also meet local poet Robert Lovell and his sisters-in-law, who they will marry; he also introduces them to the publisher Joseph Cottle). After Robespierre's execution in July, they collaborate on the "historic drama" The Fall of Robespierre, published in October. Southey's first published poetry appears and he also writes the radical play Wat Tyler this summer.
August – Ludwig Tieck graduates from the University of Göttingen and begins a literary career.
Autumn–December – English playwright Thomas Holcroft is indicted for treason as a member of the Society for Constitutional Information and held in Newgate Prison, London, but released without charge.
November 14 – The first recorded meeting of the Franklin Literary Society is held at Canonsburg Academy (modern-day Washington & Jefferson College) in Pennsylvania.

New books

Fiction
Xavier de Maistre – Voyage autour de ma chambre
Giorgio Ferrich – Fabulae ab Illyricis adagiis disumptae
Karl Friedrich Kahlert (under the pseudonym Lawrence Flammenberg) translated and adapted by Peter Teuthold – The Necromancer; or, The Tale of the Black Forest
William Godwin – Caleb Williams
Ann Radcliffe – The Mysteries of Udolpho
Mary Robinson – The Widow; or, A Picture of Modern Times
Susanna Rowson – Charlotte Temple (first American edition)
Thomas Spence – A Description of Spensonia

Children
Elizabeth Pinchard – The Two Cousins

Drama
Samuel Taylor Coleridge and Robert Southey – The Fall of Robespierre
Hannah Cowley – The Town Before You
Richard Cumberland
The Jew
The Box-Lobby Challenge
François Juste Marie Raynouard – Caton d'Utique
Mary Robinson – Nobody: A Comedy in Two Acts

Poetry

William Blake – Songs of Experience
Isabella Kelly – Collection of Poems and Fables

Non-fiction
Edward Bancroft – Experimental Researches Concerning the Philosophy of Permanent Colours
Erasmus Darwin – Zoonomia; or the Laws of Organic Life
Elizabeth Dawbarn (anonymously) – Dialogue between Clara Neville and Louisa Mills, on Loyalty
Edward Gibbon – Memoirs of My Life and Writings
Deen Mahomed – The Travels of Dean Mahomet (first book published in English by an Indian)
Thomas James Mathias – The Pursuits of Literature
Thomas Paine – The Age of Reason
William Paley – View of the Evidences of Christianity
Uvedale Price – Essay on the Picturesque, As Compared with the Sublime and The Beautiful
Patrick Russell – Natural History of Aleppo (sometimes seen as 2nd ed. of Alexander Russell's eponymous 1756 work)
Walter Whiter – Specimen of a Commentary on

Births
January 11 – Jean Philibert Damiron, French philosopher (died 1862)
May 17 – Anna Brownell Jameson, Irish-born essayist, travel writer and editor (died 1860)
May 24 – William Whewell, English polymath (died 1866)
August 16 – Jean-Henri Merle d'Aubigné, Swiss historian of the Reformation (died 1872)
September 15 – Rosine de Chabaud-Latour, French religious thinker and translator (died 1860)

Uncertain date
Emma Roberts, English travel writer and poet (died 1840)

Deaths
January 16 – Edward Gibbon, English historian (born 1737)
March 5 – Ramón de la Cruz, Spanish dramatist (born 1731)
March 24 – Jacques Hébert, French radical journalist (guillotined, born 1757)
April 5 – Susanna Blamire, English dialect poet and songwriter (born 1747)
April 13 – Nicolas Chamfort, French wit (suicide, born 1741)
April 15 – Fabre d'Églantine, French dramatist and poet (guillotined, born 1750)
April 27 – Sir William Jones, English philologist (born 1746)
June 3 – Girolamo Tiraboschi, Italian literary critic (born 1731)
June 8 – Gottfried August Bürger, German poet (born 1747)
July 25 
André Chénier, French poet (guillotined, born 1762)
Jean-Antoine Roucher, French poet (guillotined, born 1745)
August 14 – George Colman the Elder, English dramatist and essayist (born 1732)
November 16 – Rudolf Erich Raspe, German writer (born 1736)

References

 
Years of the 18th century in literature